The Wonder Again Stakes is a Grade III American Thoroughbred horse race for fillies aged three years old held over a distance of  miles on the inner turf scheduled annually in early June at Belmont Park in Elmont, New York.  The event currently carries a purse of $200,000.

History

The race is named after the Grade I winner Wonder Again who won the GI Garden City Breeders' Cup (2002) and GI Diana Handicap (2004).

The race was inaugurated in 25 May 2014 with a stakes purse of $200,000.

In 2017 the event was classified as Grade III.

The event is considered a preparatory race for the Belmont Oaks Invitational Stakes which is held in July.

In 2020 due to the COVID-19 pandemic in the United States, NYRA scheduled the event in their updated and shortened spring-summer meeting with a shorter distance of 1mile.

Records
Speed record: 
 miles – 1:46.34 Camber Parc (2019)

Largest margin of victory:
  lengths  – Camber Parc (2019)

Most wins by a jockey:
 2 – Irad Ortiz Jr. (2014, 2015)
 2 – José L. Ortiz (2019, 2020)

Most wins by a trainer:
 4 – Chad C. Brown (2015, 2017, 2019, 2022)

Most wins by an owner:
 No owner has won this race more than once.

Winners

Notes:

Fillies in bold have won the Wonder Again Stakes – Belmont Oaks Invitational Stakes double

See also
 List of American and Canadian Graded races

References

Graded stakes races in the United States
Horse races in New York (state)
Recurring sporting events established in 2014
2014 establishments in New York (state)
Flat horse races for three-year-old fillies
Grade 3 stakes races in the United States
Turf races in the United States